Dame Christina Allan Massey  (née Paul; 11 January 1863 – 19 April 1932) was a New Zealand political hostess and community leader, the wife of William Massey, the 19th Prime Minister of New Zealand.

She was a supporter of the Victoria League, vice president of the New Zealand branch of the British Red Cross Society and the Lady Liverpool Fund, and was president of the Plunket Society. In the 1926 King's Birthday Honours, she became the first New Zealand woman to be appointed a Dame Grand Cross of the Order of the British Empire.

Early years
Massey was born in Forbes, New South Wales in 1863, the eldest of four children of Scottish immigrants Christina (née Allan) and Walter Paul, a miner. At the age of 19 she married William Ferguson Massey, who was farming nearby at Mangere.

Death
Massey died in Wellington on 19 April 1932, aged 69. Two of her seven children had died in infancy. She was survived by two daughters and three sons, two of whom, Walter and John, were MPs. A third son, Frank George Massey (1887–1975), was active in local and New Zealand National Party political affairs, and won the DSO and Military Cross during the First World War, as a major in the British Army.

References

1863 births
1932 deaths
Australian emigrants to New Zealand
New Zealand Dames Grand Cross of the Order of the British Empire
People from the Central West (New South Wales)
New Zealand people of Scottish descent
New Zealand political hostesses
Spouses of prime ministers of New Zealand